James Dougherty (19 November 1878 – 1944) was an English footballer who played as a wing half. He made 136 appearances for Small Heath (renamed Birmingham in 1905), including 99 in the First Division, and also played league football for New Brighton Tower and Southern League football for Coventry City. He was twice named as reserve for England but did not play.

Honours
Small Heath
 Second Division runners-up: 1902–03

Notes

References

1878 births
1944 deaths
People from Wallasey
English footballers
Association football wing halves
New Brighton Tower F.C. players
Chorley F.C. players
Birmingham City F.C. players
Coventry City F.C. players
Worcester City F.C. players
English Football League players
Southern Football League players